The 2017 Berlin Marathon was the 44th edition of the Berlin Marathon. The marathon took place in Berlin, Germany, on 24 September 2017 and was the fourth World Marathon Majors race of the year.

The men's race was won by Eliud Kipchoge, who failed to break the world record in rainy conditions, but withstood the terrific challenge of unknown marathon debutant Guye Adola.
The women's race was won by Gladys Cherono of Kenya in 2:20:23, beating out Ruti Aga of Ethiopia by less than 20 seconds.

Results 
Race results

Men

Women

References

External links
Berlin Marathon

Berlin Marathon
Berlin Marathon
Berlin Marathon
2017 in Berlin